Euphorbia kaokoensis is a rare species of plant found in certain rocky areas of Namibia and Angola. It can appear as a woody shrub or a small tree, with green leaves that pale on undersides, which contain conspicuous veins. Males produce clusters of flowers from November to January. The species is very rare, found only at a few locations, although no threats are known.

Description
The leaf lamina are subcordate, lanceolate to ovate or, less commonly, elliptic. The leaf upper sides are green, while the lower sides are paler. When dried, they can appear dark green, yellow-green, blue-green, or between violet and black. On the leaves, the middle and lateral veins are very prominent, especially on the undersides.

TaxonomyEuphorbia kaokoensis was first recognised as Euphorbia subsalsa var. kaokoensis in 1941 by a group of botanists, including Robert Allen Dyer. In 1976, E. kaokoensis was identified as a separate species by Larry Leach. The type locality was given only as the northern Kaokoveld, in Kaokoland (modern-day Namibia). Decades later in 2014, a sterile individual was observed by botanist Wessel Swanepoel in the Otjihipa Mountains. Later that year, Swanepoel sighted another specimen, this one with flowers and fruit, in the Zebra Mountains. The second specimen was the basis of a secondary description, written by Swanepoel. He explained that the specific epithet referenced the Kaokoveld, and noted that it was likely closely related to E. trichogyne. This description was published in 2019.

Distribution and habitatEuphorbia kaokoensis'' has been recorded from a few sites in northwestern Namibia and one southwestern Angola. The area it is found receives  of rainfall annually.

Ecology
It has been observed in flower from  November to January.

Conservation
It is a relatively rare species overall. Swanepoel met a local Ovahimba herdsman from the area who had no knowledge of its existence. Despite its rarity, Swanepoel pointed out that it did not appear to be exploited by humans or other animals, so he recommended that the International Union for the Conservation of Nature (IUCN) classify it as vulnerable. Currently however, the organisation lists it as Least Concern, with its last assessment in 2004.

References

Endemic flora of Namibia
kaokoensis
Least concern plants
Taxonomy articles created by Polbot